Boven Suriname (also Upper Suriname) is a resort in Suriname, located in the Sipaliwini District.  Its population at the 2012 census was 17,954. Almost its entire population consists of Maroons

The resort is home to many small tribal villages. The main village is Pokigron. Pokigron is located at the end of a paved road via Brownsweg to the Afobakaweg, Villages to the south of Pokigron can only be accessed by boat. The settlements on the right bank of the Upper Suriname River are usually adherents to the Winti (Afro-Surinamese) religion, while the left bank is mainly Christian.

Aurora can also be accessed from the Laduani Airstrip. Botopasi, Djumu, Goddo, and Pikin Slee are served by the Botopasi Airstrip. Kajana is served by the Cayana Airstrip.

Even though Boven Suriname had long been settled by the Maroons, it wasn't until 1908 when an expedition led by Johan Eilerts de Haan set out to find the source of the Suriname River.

Villages
 Abenaston
 Asidonhopo
 Aurora
 Botopasi
 Djumu
 Goddo
 Jaw Jaw
 Kajana
 Pikin Slee
 Pokigron
 Wittikamba

References

External links

Resorts of Suriname
Populated places in Sipaliwini District